Scott Mitchell Putesky (April 28, 1968 – October 22, 2017), also known as Daisy Berkowitz, was an American musician, songwriter, composer, visual artist, and record producer. He was the co-founder of the rock band Marilyn Manson & the Spooky Kids (later shortened to just Marilyn Manson), and was the guitarist for the band until 1996. After leaving Marilyn Manson, Putesky was involved in a number of other projects such as Three ton Gate, The Linda Blairs, Jack Off Jill, Stuck on Evil (previously called Rednecks on Drugs), Kill Miss Pretty, and The Daisy Kids.

Life
Scott Putesky was born in Los Angeles, California, and was adopted and raised in New Jersey. His family is Jewish, but he described himself as atheist. Putesky's first instruments were the flute and the snare drum, and in 6th grade he joined the school's chorus, for which he apparently had a talent. He started playing the guitar when he was 15. His early loves were drawing, movies and Star Wars.

Marilyn Manson 
Putesky and Marilyn Manson met at a Fort Lauderdale club called The Reunion Room and later at a local after-party in December 1989. The two created the concept of Marilyn Manson & the Spooky Kids poking fun at American media hypocrisy and its obsessions with serial killers and beautiful women. For this act, he took the stage name of Daisy Berkowitz, devised by mixing the names of The Dukes Of Hazzard character Daisy Duke and serial killer David Berkowitz.

In 1996, creative differences with Manson caused Putesky to leave the studio before Antichrist Superstar was completed. Manson had begun to work more with the other members of the band, and the dark environment of Antichrist Superstars production led to Berkowitz being muscled out of the group. He is, however, credited for writing the music for four songs on the record, among them being the album's second single, "Tourniquet". Due to unpaid royalties, Berkowitz filed a $15 million lawsuit against Manson, which was later settled under confidential terms.

Post-Marilyn Manson work
In late 1998, Putesky joined up with longtime Marilyn Manson collaborators Jack Off Jill, replacing departing member Ho Ho Spade and playing live guitar on their 1999 West Coast tour which lasted for only a handful of gigs. His first recorded work with the band was the 1998 EP Covetous Creature, to which he lent guitar and some production. By early 1999, SMP was no longer a member of Jack Off Jill. Putesky himself was vague, but he related to MTV News that the parting was amicable. He returned once again to Ft. Lauderdale to resume work on his own music, primarily seeking a live band to perform his Three Ton Gate material. In the meantime, he successfully sued Marilyn Manson for what he claimed were unpaid royalties for his contributions to Antichrist Superstar. In the same lawsuit, Putesky was also awarded the rights to 21 unreleased recordings by Marilyn Manson & the Spooky Kids.

In July 2010, Putesky officially joined electro-punk band Kill Miss Pretty after collaborating with them on their single "Judy Garland". Following this the band began working on new material including a cover of the Spooky Kids' song "She's Not My Girlfriend".

Putesky revived Three Ton Gate shortly afterward to play live under that name in a 2011 series of dates across America starting in New York City on October 15.

Death
In September 2013, Putesky was diagnosed with stage-four colon cancer. He died on October 22, 2017.

Discography
Marilyn Manson (and the Spooky Kids)
The Raw Boned Psalms (1990)
The Beaver Meat Cleaver Beat (1990)
Big Black Bus (1990)
Grist-o-Line (1990)
Lunchbox (1991)
After School Special (1991)
Live as Hell (1992)
The Family Jams (1992)
Refrigerator (1993)
Marilyn Manson
Portrait of an American Family (1994)
Smells Like Children (1995)
Antichrist Superstar (1996)
Lunch Boxes & Choklit Cows (2004)

Three Ton Gate
Vanishing Century (1997)
Rumspringa (2002)
Lose Your Mind (2003)

Jack Off Jill
Covetous Creature (1998)

Stuck on Evil
Suntanic (2001)

Daisy Berkowitz
Millenium Effluvium (2014)

Justin Symbol
VΩIDHEAD (2014)

The Daisy Kids
Mr Conrad Samsung (2015)

Guest appearances
 2000 Years of Human Error (Godhead, 2001)
 The Chrome Recordings (TCR, 2004)
Judy Garland (Kill Miss Pretty, 2010)

References

1968 births
2017 deaths
Marilyn Manson (band) members
American heavy metal guitarists
Musicians from Fort Lauderdale, Florida
Deaths from colorectal cancer
Guitarists from Florida
20th-century American guitarists
Place of death missing
Jewish American songwriters
Jewish heavy metal musicians
Jack Off Jill members
Industrial metal musicians
Deaths from cancer in the United States
Jewish American atheists